Roundell is both a surname and a given name. Notable people with the name include:

Charles Savile Roundell (1827–1906), English cricketer, lawyer and politician
Richard Roundell (1872–1940), British politician
Roundell Palmer, 1st Earl of Selborne (1812–1895), English lawyer and politician
Roundell Palmer, 3rd Earl of Selborne (1887–1971), British administrator, intelligence officer and politician